Barry Bates (born 1 July 1939) is an Australian cricketer. He played ten first-class matches for New South Wales between 1959/60 and 1960/61.

See also
 List of New South Wales representative cricketers

References

External links
 

1939 births
Living people
Australian cricketers
New South Wales cricketers
Sportspeople from Wollongong